Pyrops coelestinus, previously known as Laternaria coelestina, is a species of planthopper belonging to a genus referred-to as lantern-bugs, sometimes known as the blue lantern bug (Vietnamese: ve sầu xanh).

Distribution and Description
This species is found in Indochina: both P. coelestinus and P. ducalis have type specimens from Cambodia, with relatively recent records for the insect fauna of Vietnam.

The head, and cephalic process are grey-black with numerous white spots (see figure) and the hind wings (not shown) are royal blue with a black zone around the wing tip.

References

External links
 

coelestinus
Hemiptera of Asia
Insects of Vietnam
Insects described in 1863